This is a list of federal spokespersons of The Greens – The Green Alternative, a political party in Austria.

References 

Political spokespersons
Green political parties
Lists of Austrian politicians